The Business Rate Supplements Act 2009 (c 7) is an Act of the Parliament of the United Kingdom. It creates a power to impose business rate supplements. It gives effect to the proposals contained in the command paper "Business rate supplements: a White Paper" (Cm 7230).

Sections 28 to 32 came into force on 2 July 2009. The rest of the Act, except for section 16(5) and Schedule 2, came into force, in England, on 19 August 2009.

References
Halsbury's Statutes,

External links
The Business Rate Supplements Act 2009, as amended from the National Archives.
The Business Rate Supplements Act 2009, as originally enacted from the National Archives.
Explanatory notes to the Business Rate Supplements Act 2009.

United Kingdom Acts of Parliament 2009
Business in the United Kingdom
Taxation in the United Kingdom
2009 in economics